Baháʼí review is a requirement within the Baháʼí Faith that members must secure the permission of a review committee of their respective National Spiritual Assembly before publishing material on the religion. The requirement was initiated by ʻAbdu'l-Bahá as a temporary measure while the religion was obscure.

The stated intention of pre-publication review is, "to protect the Faith against misrepresentation by its own followers at this early stage of its existence when comparatively few people have any knowledge of it", according to the Universal House of Justice, the governing body of the Baháʼís. Review typically entails verification of quotations from the Baháʼí writings to maintain accuracy and dignity, as well as a review of timeliness. The review does not consider literary merit or its value as a publication, and is not required for doctoral theses or informal online material, such as blogs.

The review created tension with a few Baháʼí authors, notably Juan Cole and Denis MacEoin, who left the religion in part over disagreements with reviewers. Disregard for the review process can incur, among other things, the loss of good standing for Baháʼí authors.

Historical basis
The origin of the requirement for review comes from ʻAbdu'l-Bahá. He is quoted here by Shoghi Effendi in 1922:

Shoghi Effendi further commented on the above:

Shoghi Effendi, with the above statement in mind, stated that due to the infancy of the Baháʼí Faith, the accuracy of information presented about it needed to be verified since an inaccurate statement could cause much harm to it. Shoghi Effendi wrote in March 1923:

Purpose
The review has three stated goals:
To ensure the accuracy of the presentation of the teachings of the Faith

To protect the faith from misrepresentation by its own followers:

To ensure dignity of the form

The review committee is recommended to be small, composed of two or three Baháʼís with an adequate education and knowledge of the Baháʼí Faith. They do not evaluate the literary merit of the work which is the prerogative of the publisher.

Cessation
Baháʼí institutions have signalled their intention to continue the requirement, although it is to be removed at some point in the future; they state that even though the Baháʼí Faith is no longer an obscure religion, the large majority of people do not know of its existence, and that most of its adherents are relatively new Baháʼís. Because of these two things, and that the Baháʼí Faith can no longer be protected by obscurity, it becomes more important to present a correct view early on. A guideline for Local Spiritual Assemblies produced by an office of the National Spiritual Assembly of the Baháʼís of the United States wrote in 1998,

Criticism and commentary

Juan Cole
Former Baháʼí historian Juan Cole wrote in 1998:

Denis MacEoin
Denis MacEoin was a Baháʼí for 15 years, from 1965 to 1980. He did his doctoral dissertation on the Babi movement at Cambridge in 1979. In the late 1970s, he submitted material for a Baháʼí review process, and his manuscript was rejected. He resigned from the Bahá'í faith and later published the material with E.J. Brill as The Sources for Early Bābī Doctrine and History. He went on to write very critically of the review process. 

In response to accusations by Denis MacEoin of censorship, Baháʼí author Moojan Momen wrote:

Others
Barney Leith wrote in 1995: "I submit that it is no longer possible or right for National Assemblies to try to control the kinds of things Bahá'ís publish about their Faith."

Former Baháʼí, William Garlington, wrote in 2005:

Margit Warburg, a sociologist who published a detailed study of the religion in 2006, wrote:

Mikhail Sergeev, in his book, Theory of Religious Cycles: Tradition, Modernity, and the Bahá'í Faith (2015) wrote:

Notes

References

External links
Writers and Writing - Compilation of Baháʼí writings on Baháʼí authorship (July 1980)
The crisis in Babi and Baha'i studies: part of a wider crisis in academic freedom? - by Denis MacEoin (1990)

Review